The 1983 Northwestern Wildcats team represented Northwestern University during the 1983 NCAA Division I-A football season. In their third year under head coach Dennis Green, the Wildcats compiled a 2–9 record (2–7 against Big Ten Conference opponents) and finished in a tie for eighth place in the Big Ten Conference.

The team's offensive leaders were quarterback Sandy Schwab with 1,838 passing yards, Ricky Edwards with 561 rushing yards, and Ricky Edwards with 570 receiving yards. Punter John Kidd received first-team All-Big Ten honors from both the Associated Press and the United Press International.

Schedule

Personnel
QB Sandy Schwab, Soph.

References

Northwestern
Northwestern Wildcats football seasons
Northwestern Wildcats football